Gavin Mays (born 1989), better known by his stage name Cities Aviv, is an American rapper and record producer from Memphis, Tennessee.

Early life
Gavin Mays was born and raised in Memphis, Tennessee. He attended Overton High School and Cordova High School. At the age of 20, he dropped out of the University of Memphis, where he studied journalism.

Career
Prior to his career as a rapper, Mays was a lead singer of a hardcore punk band, Copwatch. During his involvement with the band, he began experimenting with hip hop music, eventually making a full leap into the genre. In 2011, he released his debut mixtape,  Digital Lows, which received positive reviews from music publications such as Pitchfork and Spin.

In 2012, he released his follow-up mixtape, Black Pleasure, through streetwear company Mishka NYC's record label before signing to Young One Records. After releasing the "URL IRL" single in 2013, he released his debut studio album, Come to Life, on Young One Records in 2014. In 2018, he released Raised for a Better View.

Musical style and influences
Cities Aviv is known for his eclectic production style. His songs sample various artists of different genres. His influences include Three 6 Mafia, 8Ball & MJG, Black Moon, Big Pun, Non Phixion, and soul music, as well as rock music acts Joy Division and Deftones. Critics also noted post-punk influences on his works, accompanied by lyrical references to Joy Division and Psychic TV.

Cities Aviv's rapping style and flow was compared to those of RZA and MC Ride of Death Grips.

Discography

Studio albums
 Come to Life (Young One Records, 2014)
 Your Discretion Is Trust (2015)
 Immortal Flame (2020)
 Gum (2020)
 Accompanied by a Blazing Solo (2020)
 The Crashing Sound of How It Goes (Total Works / PTP, 2021)
 Man Plays the Horn (2022)
 Working Title for the Album Secret Waters (2022)

Mixtapes
 Digital Lows (2011)
 Black Pleasure (2012)
 Raised for a Better View (2018)

Singles
 "Coastin" (2011)
 "Wet Dream" (2011)
 "Flex Your Gold" (2012)
 "I Want All" (2012)
 "URL IRL" (2013)
 "If I Could Hold Your Soul" (2017)
 "WAYS OF THE WORLD" (2021)
 "CINEMA CLUB" (2022)

Guest appearances
 Lushlife - "She's a Buddhist, I'm a Cubist" from Plateau Vision (2012)
 Knifefight - "Torn Victor" from Knifefight (2013)
 Mr. Flash - "Number One" from Sonic Crusader (2014)
 Mykki Blanco - "Moshin in the Front" from Gay Dog Food (2014)
 Nasty Nigel - "Home Box Office" from El Ultimo Playboy: La Vida Y Los Tiempos De Nigel Rubirosa (2016)
 Show Me the Body - "Stress" from Corpus I (2017)
 Beach Fossils - "Rise" from Somersault (2017)

Productions
 Antwon - "During Mimis" from Heavy Hearted in Doldrums (2014)

References

External links
 Cities Aviv at Bandcamp
 

1989 births
Living people
Rappers from Memphis, Tennessee
Musicians from Memphis, Tennessee
African-American male rappers
American male rappers
African-American record producers
American hip hop record producers
Alternative hip hop musicians
American punk rock singers
African-American rock musicians
21st-century American rappers
21st-century American male musicians
21st-century African-American musicians
20th-century African-American people